Davide Mariani (born 19 May 1991 in Zürich) is a Swiss footballer of Italian and Mexican descent who plays as a midfielder for Schaffhausen. He also holds Italian citizenship.

Career
Born in Zürich, Mariani began his playing career at local club FC Zürich. He made his senior team debut in the Swiss Super League coming on as a substitute on 15 July 2012 in a 1–1 away draw against Luzern. On 9 December 2012, Mariani scored his first goal against Köniz in a match of the Swiss Cup.

Career statistics

Honours
Zürich
Swiss Cup: 2013–14

References

External links
 
 Profile at LevskiSofia.info

1991 births
Living people
Swiss men's footballers
Swiss Super League players
Swiss Challenge League players
First Professional Football League (Bulgaria) players
FC Zürich players
FC Schaffhausen players
FC Lugano players
PFC Levski Sofia players
Shabab Al-Ahli Club players
Al-Ittihad Kalba SC players
Expatriate footballers in Bulgaria
Swiss expatriate sportspeople in Bulgaria
Expatriate footballers in the United Arab Emirates
Swiss people of Italian descent
Swiss people of Mexican descent
People with acquired Italian citizenship
Association football midfielders
Footballers from Zürich